Wyatt Carter Smith (born February 13, 1977) is an American former professional ice hockey player who played as a journeyman center in the National Hockey League before finishing his career with ERC Ingolstadt of the Deutsche Eishockey Liga.

Playing career
From 1995 to 1999, he played at the University of Minnesota. In 1997, during his collegiate career, he was drafted by the Phoenix Coyotes in the ninth round with the 233rd overall pick. He has also played on the Nashville Predators, New York Islanders, Minnesota Wild and the Colorado Avalanche.

On July 3, 2008, Smith was signed as a free agent by the Tampa Bay Lightning for the 2008–09 season. After playing 18 games with affiliate, the Norfolk Admirals, Smith was traded by the Lightning back to the team that drafted him the Phoenix Coyotes on November 25, 2008. Smith was then reassigned to the Coyotes' affiliate, the San Antonio Rampage, of the AHL.

On July 31, 2009, Smith was signed to a one-year contract with the Pittsburgh Penguins. Assigned to Pittsburgh's AHL affiliate, Wyatt remained with the Wilkes-Barre/Scranton Penguins as captain for the duration of the 2009–10 season and finished fourth on the team in scoring with 48 points in 76 contests.

On September 2, 2010, Smith signed as a free agent to a one-year contract with the Boston Bruins for the 2010–11 season. Signed to fulfill a veteran presence with the Bruins AHL affiliate in Providence, Smith struggled to produce offensively scoring 2 goals in 30 games. After clearing waivers on December 31, 2010, Smith was released from his contract and signed in Europe for the remainder of the season with German team, ERC Ingolstadt of the DEL.

Career statistics

Regular season and playoffs

International

Awards and honors

References

External links

1977 births
American men's ice hockey centers
Arizona Coyotes draft picks
Bridgeport Sound Tigers players
Colorado Avalanche players
ERC Ingolstadt players
Houston Aeros (1994–2013) players
Ice hockey players from Minnesota
Lake Erie Monsters players
Living people
Milwaukee Admirals players
Minnesota Golden Gophers men's ice hockey players
Minnesota Wild players
Nashville Predators players
New York Islanders players
Norfolk Admirals players
People from Thief River Falls, Minnesota
Phoenix Coyotes players
Providence Bruins players
San Antonio Rampage players
Springfield Falcons players
Vancouver Canucks scouts
Wilkes-Barre/Scranton Penguins players